DNA polymerase delta (DNA Pol δ) is an enzyme complex found in eukaryotes that is involved in DNA replication and repair. The DNA polymerase delta complex consists of 4 subunits: POLD1, POLD2, POLD3, and POLD4. DNA Pol δ is an enzyme used for both leading and lagging strand synthesis. It exhibits increased processivity when interacting with the proliferating cell nuclear antigen (PCNA). As well, the multisubunit protein replication factor C, through its role as the clamp loader for PCNA (which involves catalysing the loading of PCNA on to DNA) is important for DNA Pol δ function.

References

External links 
 

EC 2.7.7
DNA replication
DNA repair
DNA-binding proteins